The New Mexico Energy, Minerals and Natural Resources Department (EMNRD) is a state agency in New Mexico tasked with managing and protecting the natural and energy resources of New Mexico.

The Department is led by the cabinet secretary of energy, minerals and natural resources. The cabinet secretary is appointed by the governor, with the approval of the New Mexico Senate, to serve at his/her pleasure. The current cabinet secretary is Sarah Cottrell Propst, appointed by Governor Michelle Lujan Grisham on December 14, 2018.

History
The New Mexico Energy, Minerals and Natural Resources Department was created in 1987 by the enactment of the Energy, Minerals and Natural Resources Department Act. The Act merged the Energy and Minerals Department and the Natural Resources Department into a single, unified entity.

The mission of EMNRD is to protect, manage, conserve and oversee the responsible use of the state’s natural resources. EMNRD is charged with:
protecting the environment and ensuring the reclamation of land and resources affected by mining activities 
growing and sustaining healthy forests
leading the development of reliable energy

Overview
The EMNRD has six main missions: 
Renewable Energy and Energy Efficiency
Health Forests
State Parks
Mine Reclamation
Oil and Gas Conservation
Program Support

For administrative support purposes only, the New Mexico Department of Game and Fish is attached to EMNRD.

Renewable energy
The Energy Conservation and Management Division provides the Renewable Energy and Energy Efficiency Program of EMNRD. The Division oversee Statewide energy conservation efforts including the use of alternative fuels. These fuels include solar, wind, geothermal, and biomass resources. This is accomplished via partnerships with private businesses, higher education universities, and research laboratories to invest in clean energy.

The division serves as the United States Department of Energy state administering agency for federal energy grants.

Forestry
The Healthy Forests Program is responsible for the protection of all state forests. The program is responsible for statewide fire management and suppression activities as well as overall tree health. The Program also oversee all forest restoration efforts.

State parks
The State Parks Program oversees the operations of state parks across the State. These state parks are designed to protect and preserve the state's natural environment.

Mining and minerals
The Mining and Minerals Division operates the Department's Mine Reclamation Program. The Division oversees all energy and non-energy mining operations in the state. This is accomplished by issuing permits to mining companies, inspecting mining operations, reclaiming abandoned mines, and education members of the public about mining. New Mexico heavily benefits from mined natural resources such as oil, copper, coal, petroleum, potash, molybdenum, uranium, gold, silver, and lead.

Oil and gas
The Oil Conservation Division oversees all oil, gas, and geothermal drilling operations in the state. This is accomplished by issuing permits to drilling companies, inspecting drilling operations, protecting mineral rights, and preventing fresh water contamination.

The Division is composed of an Administrative and Records Bureau, a Fiscal Bureau, an Engineering and Geological Services Bureau, and Environmental Bureau, a Legal Bureau, and four District Offices.

Program support
The Program Support Program provides centralized administrative and management support to all other aspects of the Department.

Organization
The head of EMNRD is the cabinet secretary of energy, minerals and natural resources. The cabinet secretary is appointed by the governor of New Mexico, with the approval of the New Mexico Senate, and serves as a member of the Governor's Cabinet.

The Cabinet Secretary is assisted by a Deputy Secretary and six division directors. Each of the division directors is appointed by the cabinet secretary with the approval of the governor.

Cabinet secretary
Deputy secretary
Administrative Services Division
State Parks Division
Forestry Division
Energy Conservation and Management Division
Mining and Minerals Division
Oil Conservation Division

Budget and Personnel

References

External links

Government agencies established in 1986
1986 establishments in New Mexico
State agencies of New Mexico
Energy ministries
New Mexico